Venezolana Internacional de Aviación Sociedad Anónima, or VIASA for short, was the Venezuelan flag carrier airline between 1960 and 1997. It was headquartered in the Torre Viasa in Caracas.

History

Early years

Viasa was envisioned by the government of Venezuela in 1959 to create a new company that could serve as the country's flag carrier and run without government intervention. It was set up in 1960 when the international routes operated by Línea Aeropostal Venezolana (LAV) and Avensa were merged and taken over by the newly created carrier. The government contributed with 55% of the capital, while private investors – among which were LAV and Avensa, the latter owned by Grupo Boulton and Pan American World Airways—contributed with the remainder. The board of directors came entirely from the private sector. The first president of the airline was Mr. R. van den Branden; the first chairman of the board was Mr. Oscar Augusto Machado Zuloaga, a very competent and well liked gentleman, who was instrumental in Viasa's commercial success and immediate acceptance by the market.

In early 1961, the airline signed an agreement with KLM to operate a Douglas DC-8 on Viasa's behalf, aimed at starting operations to Europe in April that year; KLM maintained a nurturing relationship with Viasa for another 24 years. In the same year, Avensa transferred two Douglas DC-6Bs to the company, as well as an order for a Convair 880-22M. Viasa boosted their Convair 880 order by purchasing another one. The airline flew the type mostly on routes to North America. Also in 1961, the airline joined the International Air Transport Association, becoming its 89th member. In 1963, Viasa started a commercial agreement with Iberia and KLM for operations through the mid-Atlantic. The same year, a third Convair 880 was ordered. Until the first DC-8-50 the company had ordered in early 1965 was delivered, long-haul services using the type were provided with wet-leased aircraft from KLM. The type was also chartered from KLM for deployment on the Caribbean routes. By , the first DC-8-50 was already forming part of the company's fleet along with the three Convair 880s, while an additional DC-8-50 was on order. To complement these two DC-8-50s, the carrier ordered two Douglas DC-8-63s in early 1967. Two Convair 880s were sold to Cathay Pacific in mid-1967. Also in 1967, Viasa started up a Panamanian airline named Panameña Internacional de Aviación SA (PAISA), with KLM support; This company began operations on 3 May 1967 with two DC-9-10s leased to VIASA from Avensa, which were in turn sub-leased to PAISA. In 1968, VIASA set up a wholly owned, non-IATA member, national cargo airline named Transportes Aereos de Carga SA, more commonly known as Transcarga, which in its beginnings served Caracas, Curaçao, Maracaibo, Miami and New York.

In March 1970, the Government of Venezuela had a majority stake (55%) in the carrier, while the balance was held by private investors. Viasa's fleet strength at this time was eight: two DC-8-63s, two DC-8-50s, a DC-8-50F, a Convair 880, and two DC-9-10s. This event was a milestone for Viasa, as it became the first South American carrier to operate wide-body aircraft across the Atlantic. Through KLM, the company also placed an order for two McDonnell Douglas DC-10s the same year, and bought two Douglas DC-8-33s from the Dutch carrier as well. Also in 1972, the route network saw the incorporation of Washington and Toronto, Ontario, Canada.

With the lease of a Douglas DC-8-50 from KLM in 1974, and the sale of two aircraft of the same type to Aeroperú the same year, by  the Viasa's fleet consisted of two DC-8-63s, one DC-8-50, two DC-8-30s, and one DC-10-30, while another DC-10-30 was yet to be delivered.

In 1983, Viasa took delivery of two McDonnell Douglas DC-9 Super 80s. The early 1980s marked an overturn in the carrier's finances, as both the worldwide collapse of oil prices in the decade and the subsequent devaluation of the bolivar since 1983 affected the airline, which suffered a 41% drop in year-on-year traffic in 1983 and had accumulated a debt of VEB210 million in 1984, a year in which the carrier had a negative net value. That year, the crisis forced the company's work force to be cut by 30%, the fleet to be reduced (partly because of noise restrictions within the United States), and some Caribbean destinations to be dropped. Likewise, competition increased on some routes, most notably Miami and New York, where Viasa was the erstwhile sole operator or it had a single competitor at most. Nevertheless, Viasa made an operating profit of VEB125 million (US$4 million) and a net profit of VEB97 million in 1986. In early 1988, the fleet consisted of only five DC-10s, and two Airbus A300s acquired from Lufthansa through a leasing agreement, that were deployed mostly on domestic and regional routes. A Caracas–Havana service was launched in 1989, along with a stopover in São Paulo on the Caracas–Rio de Janeiro route. In March 1990, Viasa's fleet consisted of two Airbus A300B4s, one DC-8-61HF, and five DC-10-30s, and was wholly owned by the Venezuelan government. At this time, it served a network radiating from Barcelona, Caracas, Maracaibo and Porlamar to Amsterdam, Aruba, Bogotá, Buenos Aires, Curaçao, Frankfurt, Houston, Lima, Lisbon, London, Madrid, Miami, Milan, New York, Oporto, Paris, Quito, Rio de Janeiro, Rome, Santiago, Santiago de Compostela, Santo Domingo, San Juan and Zürich. Toronto and Vancouver were served on a seasonal basis.

Nationalisation

Viasa had been a model of good management and it had returned a profit every year since its creation. Viasa posted its first ever loss for the October 1975 – September 1976 fiscal year, plagued by rising fuel costs and union problems. The government nationalised the airline and began its downturn. This was not noticeable at first, since Venezuela's strong economy was backed by high oil revenue and the government did not mind pumping in money to cover mounting losses.

By 1979, Viasa had built a fleet of 6 DC-10-30s, 2 DC-8-63s, 2 DC-8-53s and 1 DC-8-63F.

In the summer of 1982, Viasa leased a couple of MD-82s from KLM for Caribbean routes and for new flights from Barquisimeto, Barcelona and Porlamar to Miami. These were returned to KLM in 1984.

In 1985, Viasa got rid of all its DC-8s plus one DC-10-30 and kept just five DC-10-30s. It revamped its livery almost completely in 1986, adopting a whiter body with three-tone blue cheatlines under the windows. The orange tail retained the white Viasa letters adopted in 1978 with the arrival of DC-10-30 YV-135C.

Two former Lufthansa Airbus A300-B4 jets were leased from GPA in 1987 for United States and South American services. In the same year, for the first time ever, VIASA began domestic services and made use of empty seats on the Caracas-Maracaibo and Caracas-Porlamar routes.

Privatisation

The red ink continued to flow and, with the new government policies adopted in 1989, Viasa became a target for privatisation. The initial plans of the government were to allocate 60% of the company to private investors, keep 20% of the shares, and transfer the balance to the airline workers. In , Iberia and KLM were approved as bidders in the privatisation process, the former teaming up with Venezuela's Banco Provincial, and the latter partnering with Northwest Airlines and other four local entities. Iberia was the only bidder left with a  million offer, after KLM stepped aside citing that a price of  million for 60% of the shares was too high.

Iberia apparently milked the airline (some Venezuelans point at this as one of Viasa's causes of bankruptcy). While it could be argued that it was not wise to sell a government owned leasing company to another government owned leasing company, changing the old ways of Viasa was an uphill battle. 
All its aircraft were placed under Iberia's ownership, the Airbuses were sent back to GPA, former Iberia 727s were used by Viasa (competing on the US routes versus American's 757s or A300-600s and United's 757s) and all supplies were purchased centrally through Madrid.

Operations came to a halt following the pilots and cabin crew staff rejecting a restructuring plan raised by Iberia and the state-run holding company that had a 40% interest in Viasa at that time, with both consortiums refusing to inject more cash into the airline. Shareholders, with Iberia being the major one having 45% of the stakes at the time, later decided to liquidate the carrier. Viasa's routes were divided between Aeropostal, Avensa and Aserca.

Destinations

Following is a list of destinations Viasa flew to as part of its scheduled destinations.

Fleet

Viasa previously operated the following aircraft:

Airbus A300B4
Airbus A300C4
Boeing 747-100
Boeing 747-200B
Boeing 747-200C
Boeing 747-200F
Boeing 727-200
Convair 880
Curtiss C-46
Douglas DC-7C
Douglas DC-7F
Douglas DC-8-30
Douglas DC-8-40
Douglas DC-8-50
Douglas DC-8-60
Douglas DC-6B
Douglas DC-9-10
Douglas DC-9-30
Lockheed Super Constellation
McDonnell Douglas DC-10-30
McDonnell Douglas MD-80

Livery
The airline's livery consisted of silver on the belly, white on the top part of the fuselage color, with orange and blue cheatlines that went all the way to the start of the tail. The fuselage featured the name Viasa written in orange on top of the cheatlines. The tail was all orange, with the name Viasa in white. After Iberia took over, all the fuselage went white, and so did the tail. The cheatlines were made thicker around the plane's cockpit, to resemble Iberia's planes.

Accidents and incidents
According to Aviation Safety Network, Viasa experienced five accidents/incidents events throughout its history, with two of them being deadly ones, yielding a combined death toll of 216 fatalities, plus a hijacking episode. The two deadly accidents occurred with leased aircraft. Following is a list of the events that carried with the hull-loss of the aircraft involved.

See also 
 Transportation in Venezuela

Notes and references

Notes

Citations

External links

 
Defunct airlines of Venezuela
Airlines established in 1960
Airlines disestablished in 1997
1997 disestablishments in Venezuela
Venezuelan companies established in 1960